The 1952 Baylor Bears football team represented Baylor University in the 1952 college football season. They finished with a 4-4-2 record and placed fifth in the Southwest Conference for the year. Four players – Jack Sisco (Center), Robert Knowles (Tackle), Bill Athey (Guard) and Jerry Coody (Back) – were selected as All-Conference players.

Schedule

References

Baylor
Baylor Bears football seasons
Baylor Bears football